This article lists events from the year 2018 in Niger.

Incumbents
President: Mahamadou Issoufou 
Prime Minister: Brigi Rafini

Events

Sports
2018 Niger Cup

Deaths

20 February – Lucien Bouchardeau, football referee (b. 1961).

4 July – Boukary Adji, politician, Prime Minister 1996 (b. 1939) .

29 October – Mariama Keïta, journalist and feminist activist (b. 1946).

21 November – Mamane Barka, musician (b. 1958/1959).

References

Links

 
2010s in Niger 
Years of the 21st century in Niger 
Niger 
Niger